John R. Ralston (April 26, 1927 – September 14, 2019) was an American football player, coach, and sports executive.  He served as the head football coach at Utah State University (1959–1962), Stanford University (1963–1971), and San Jose State University (1993–1996), compiling a career college football record of 97–81–4.  Ralston also coached the Denver Broncos of the National Football League (NFL) from 1972 to 1976, amassing a record of 34–33–3, and the Oakland Invaders of the United States Football League (USFL) in 1983 and part of the 1984 season, tallying a mark of 9–12.  He was inducted into the College Football Hall of Fame as a coach in 1992.

Early life, education, and playing career
Born in Oakland, California, Ralston and his family moved to Norway, Michigan when he was eight years old.  On graduating from Norway High School in 1944, he went to the University of California, Berkeley and played linebacker there on two Rose Bowl teams before earning his physical education degree in 1951.

Coaching career
Ralston began his coaching career in 1952 at San Lorenzo High School in San Lorenzo, California, just south of Oakland. He subsequently was an assistant coach at Mt. Diablo High School in Concord, California. in 1953 and 1954. He then spent three seasons as an assistant coach at Cal from 1955–1958. Ralston was then named head coach at Utah State University in 1959. In four years there, he compiled a 31–11–1 record and won two Skyline Conference championships. Ralston moved to Stanford University in 1963 and, over nine seasons, built a mark of 55–36–3. In his last two seasons, 1970–1971, Ralston's teams won two Pacific-8 titles and notched back-to-back Rose Bowl victories over Ohio State and Michigan, both of whom were undefeated coming into the Rose Bowl game. Under Ralston's tutelage, Stanford quarterback Jim Plunkett won the Heisman Trophy in 1970.

In 1972, Ralston departed the San Francisco Bay Area again, this time for the Rocky Mountains and the Denver Broncos. The Broncos finished with a 5–9 record in 1972. In 1973, a year which included the "Orange Monday" game played in front of a prime-time national television audience in which the Broncos came from behind to earn a tie on Jim Turner's 35-yard field goal, Ralston coached the team into first place with a 6–3–2 record. With their first winning season in franchise history under their belt and with the AFC West title on the line, the Broncos' season ended with a 21–17 loss to the Oakland Raiders.  Ralston was the UPI's choice as AFC Coach of the Year after Denver achieved its first-ever winning season at 7–5–2. In 1974, Ralston coached the Broncos to a 7–6–1 record for their second consecutive winning season. In 1975 the Broncos finished with a 6–8 record, but the following year the team improved and finished with a 9–5 record. The record was not, however, good enough qualify the Broncos for the playoffs. In five seasons with the Broncos, Ralston guided the team to winning seasons three times and an overall record of 34–33–3; despite this, he never went to the playoffs during his Bronco (and NFL head coaching) tenure.

After leaving the Broncos, Ralston held several assistant coaching jobs which included the Philadelphia Eagles, the San Francisco 49ers, the Toronto Argonauts of the Canadian Football League, and as a head coach in the USFL with the Oakland Invaders. Ralston also coached in Europe. He was the head coach of the Dutch Lions, the national football team of the Netherlands. With the Lions, Ralston won the bronze medal in the European Championships in Helsinki, Finland in 1991. After being inducted to the College Football Hall of Fame in 1992, Ralston came out of retirement in 1993 to be head coach at San Jose State University. After the 1996 season, Ralston resigned from the position to become special assistant to athletic director Tom Brennan. Ralston later became special assistant to the football team, where he remained until the 2013 season. He died on September 14, 2019 at the age of 92.

Head coaching record

College

NFL

References

External links
 

1927 births
2019 deaths
American football linebackers
California Golden Bears football coaches
California Golden Bears football players
Coaches of American football from California
College Football Hall of Fame inductees
Denver Broncos coaches
Denver Broncos executives
High school football coaches in California
National Football League general managers
People from Norway, Michigan
Players of American football from Oakland, California
San Jose State Spartans football coaches
Stanford Cardinal football coaches
Toronto Argonauts coaches
United States Football League coaches
Utah State Aggies football coaches
Denver Broncos head coaches